Charles Bassett Nieson is a former Major League Baseball pitcher who appeared in 2 games for the Minnesota Twins in 1964.

Biography 
Nieson was born on September 24, 1942 in Hanford, California. He attended Fresno State University.

On September 18, 1964, he made his big league debut at the age of 21. He wore number 29. The next day, he played his final game. In the two games he played, he pitched in a total of two innings. He struck out 5, walked one, and gave up one hit, a home run to Frank Malzone of the Boston Red Sox. With 5 strikeouts in 8 batters faced, he struck out 62.5% of the batters he faced -- which is the all-time career best for any MLB pitcher with 2 or more batters faced.

He enjoys fishing and was the 2010 Big Stone Walleye champion.

References

External links

1942 births
Living people
Atlanta Crackers players
Baseball players from California
Charlotte Hornets (baseball) players
Denver Bears players
Fort Walton Beach Jets players
Fresno State Bulldogs baseball players
Major League Baseball pitchers
Minnesota Twins players
People from Hanford, California